Ashton is a town in the Adelaide Hills in South Australia. It was named by George Hunt in 1858 after his home Ashton in England.  Ashton is from the old English word 'aesctun', which means 'ash tree town'.

General information
The Ashton General Store, Bakery and original post office was established in 1890 by Herbert and Emily Lovibond (née Stephens) until 1941. During this time it was also known as "Mrs Lovibonds Emporium". In its later years the store has seen other incarnations such as the antique store "Cache of Curios" run by R & C Clothier.  In 1986 the old butcher shop became the new post office, deli and petrol station run by B & E Robertson.  The current Ashton Community Post Office operates Monday to Friday from 8:30 to 10:00 am. 
 
The Ashton oval was home to the Eastern Rangers Football Club (Australian rules) until it merged with Uraidla Football Club in 1997.  The clubrooms and grounds are still home to Eastern Ranges Cricket Club as well as a venue for Scout meetings and private functions.  The venue is now also home to the Rangers Junior Soccer club. Facilities include one football/cricket oval, practice nets, tennis courts, change rooms, toilets, bar, kitchen and club rooms. Ashton

Located in the town's center, the Ashton Community Memorial Hall is available for hire for public and private functions.  Facilities include full kitchen, internal and external canteen windows, toilets, car park and stage in addition to the large, wood floored hall.

The original inhabitants of this area were the Peramangk aboriginal people.

Produce
Fruit orchards represent a significant part of the land usage and history of Ashton.  Yearly crops include cherries, apples, lemons, pears as well as many other fruits and vegetables.  In addition, Ashton is home to facilities for the cold storage of produce although today's ease of transport and close proximity to Adelaide has meant they aren't as extensively used as in the past.

Directions
The simplest route from the city is North Terrace, Magill Road, Old Norton Summit Road, Lobethal Road (all of which are continuations of the same road).

Eastern Rangers Football Club

The Eastern Rangers Football Club was formed when the Lenswood Rangers Football Club, and Ashton Football Club merged to form one club. Known as the saints, the Football club competed in the Hills Football League until the club merged with the neighboring Uraidla Football Club to form the Uraidla Districts Football Club. The Eastern Rangers club tasted A Grade premiership success in just one season in 1987 in the Hills Football League's First Division. After tasting Premiership success the club struggled in the leagues first division and therefore moved to the HFL's second division. The club then made one last shot at glory making the second division's grand final in 1995 but lost the game. After talks with the Uraidla football club the club decided to merge creating the Uraidla Districts football club. The new club recently tasted A grade premiership success in 2005 and were the front runners in the 2006 and 2007 season but lost the grand final to the Mount Lofty District Football Club.

References

Towns in South Australia